Home: Adventures with Tip & Oh is an American 2D-animated television series produced by DreamWorks Animation and animated by Titmouse, which debuted in July 2016 as a Netflix original series.

Series overview

Episodes

Season 1 (2016)

Season 2 (2017)

Season 3 (2017)

Special (2017)

Season 4 (2018)

References

Lists of American children's animated television series episodes